Law enforcement in Malaysia is performed by numerous law enforcement agencies and generally comes under the direct purview of the Royal Malaysia Police, the main government agency entrusted with the maintenance of law and order in the country. Like many federal nations, the nature of the Constitution of Malaysia mandates law and order as a subject of the state, therefore the bulk of the policing lies with the respective states and territories of Malaysia.

Police forces

Royal Malaysia Police

The Royal Malaysia Police is the main agency tasked with maintaining law and order in Malaysia. The force is a centralised organisation with responsibilities ranging from traffic control to intelligence gathering. Its headquarters is located at Bukit Aman, Kuala Lumpur. The constitution, control, employment, recruitment, fund, discipline, duties and powers of the police force is specified and governed by the Police Act 1967.

An occupied by the Ministry of Home Affairs, RMP have six departments involved in crime and terrorism prevention and two departments involved in the administration. All departments are led by the directors with the rank of Commissioner of Police (Army Equivalent rank of Three Stars General or Lieutenant-General).

Private Security Services
The Malaysian Government utilises the services of several auxiliary police, volunteer police, and police cadet forces. An auxiliary police in RMP refers to sworn security police serving in autonomous government agencies and key government-linked companies/entities, such as:
 Malaysian Airports Holdings Berhad
 Petroleum Nasional Berhad (Petronas)
 Northport (Malaysia) Bhd
 Malayan Railways
 Pos Malaysia Holdings Berhad
 Federal Land Development Agency (FELDA)
 Bank Simpanan Nasional - BSN
 Tenaga Nasional

The volunteer police force in RMP has formed two corps, such as Police Volunteer Reserve and Police Undergraduate Voluntary Corps. The Police Volunteer Reserve (PVR) is a special police as well as a supporting unit of the full-time RMP forces where normal citizens could volunteer to help to maintain peace and security of their respective neighbourhoods and public areas, while Police Undergraduate Voluntary Corps is an undergraduate police volunteer organisation to undergoing periodic training times to times in three years in their respective university and will be commissioned as Inspector by the Inspector General of Police in the end of the three years training.

Coast guards

Malaysian Maritime Enforcement Agency
The Malaysian Maritime Enforcement Agency is the principal government agency tasked with maintaining law and order and co-ordinating search and rescue operations in the Malaysian Maritime Zone and on the high seas. It is in effect the coast guard of Malaysia. The agency is not part of nor are there any plans for it be integrated into the Malaysian Armed Forces. The Agency and its members are part of the Malaysian Civil Service and report directly to the Prime Minister's Department.

Agencies

Besides the RMP and MMEA, other government agencies that also enforce specific laws are as follows:

Royal Malaysian Customs

The Royal Malaysian Customs (RMC) is the government agency of the Ministry of Finance of the Malaysia. The department is responsible for administrating the nation's indirect tax policy. In other words, KDRM administers seven main and thirty-nine subsidiary laws. Apart from this, KDRM implements eighteen laws for other government agencies.

Malaysian Anti-Corruption Commission

The Malaysian Anti-Corruption Commission is a government agency in Malaysia that investigates and prosecutes corruption in the public and private sectors. The MACC was modelled after top anti-corruption agencies, such as the Hong Kong's Independent Commission Against Corruption and the New South Wales Independent Commission Against Corruption, Australia. The MACC is currently headed by Chief Commissioner Datuk Abu Kassim Bin Mohamed. He was appointed in January 2010 to replace former Chief Commissioner Datuk Seri Ahmad Said Bin Hamdan. Similarly, the agency is currently under the Prime Minister's Department.

RELA
RELA Corps is a paramilitary civil volunteer corps formed by the Malaysian government. Their main duty is to check the travelling documents and immigration permits of foreigners in Malaysian cities, including tourists, visitors and migrants to reduce the increasing rate of illegal immigrants in Malaysia. RELA has the authority to deal with situations like policemen, such as raiding suspected streets or places such as factories, restaurants and even hotels.

They are also fully authorised to conduct the interrogation and even detaining people who forget to bring their travelling documents, like passports and/or working permits. Besides that they are also tasked with security works at times. During times of war, they are absorbed into the Malaysian Army as support groups despite their law enforcing duties. They are also tasked to do SAR works if needed.

Immigration Department of Malaysia

Malaysian Road Transport Department
The Malaysian Road Transport Department is a government department under the Malaysian Ministry of Transport. This department is responsible for issuing Malaysian number plates. According to the Road Transport Act, the enforcement is charged with the responsibility of undertaking registration and licensing of drivers and all motor vehicles and trailers in Malaysia.

See also

 National Anti-Drug Agency

 Crime in Malaysia
 Laws of Malaysia
 Law enforcement in Singapore

References